The Branco River is a river of Paraná state in southern Brazil.The Branco follows a south-southwesterly course for 482 mi (775 km) before it joins the Negro River, a major tributary of the Amazon, via numerous channels.

See also
List of rivers of Paraná

References

Brazilian Ministry of Transport

Rivers of Paraná (state)